Shahi Bazaar is a bazaar situated in Hyderabad, Sindh. It is one of the longest bazaar in Asia. The market begins from Pacco Qillo and concludes at Market Tower.

References

Bazaars in Sindh
Tourist attractions in Hyderabad, Sindh